{{Infobox film
| name           = Tender are the Feet
| image          = Tender_are_the_Feet_Poster.jpg
| caption        = Original poster by Bagyi Aung Soe.
| director       = Maung Wunna
| producer       = Min Lwin
| writer         = Aung Lin (novel)  Min Shin (screenplay)
| starring       = San San Aye  Zaw Lwin
| music          = Master Thein  Sein Bo Tint
| cinematography = Maung Soe
| editing        = Maung Wunna
| distributor    = Min Lwin Films  
| released       = 
| runtime        = 106 minutes
| country        = Myanmar
| language       = Burmese
| budget         = 
| gross          =
}}Tender are the Feet'' (Pronounced as Ché Phawa Daw Nu Nu) is a 1973 Burmese film directed by Maung Wunna. After 42 years of regional release, the film was premiered at the Forum section of the 64th Berlin Film Festival in February 2014.

Plot
Sein Lin (Zaw Lwin) is the drummer for a traditional Burmese dance theater group in Rangoon, who is very passionate about Burmese music, art and cultural traditions. He gets frustrated when, in his opinion, one of the dancers dances against—not with—the beat, and he turns his back on his troupe, only to join another soon after, where he meet and falls in love with beautiful dancer Khin San (San San Aye). Yet Khin San is at first affronted by Sein Lin's teachings. Although they argue incessantly, they cannot deny their attraction for one another. When she leaves the group to pursue a career as a film actress, he gives her a small figure as a keepsake, a symbol of traditional theater. He tells her to return it only when she is certain she wants to stay in film. After celebrating her first cinema successes and deciding to marry producer Hla Tun (Aung Pyae), Khin San finally gives the figure back to the heart-broken Sein Lin. The story takes a different turn however when Khin San realizes that Hla Tun has been keeping something significant from her, and she returns to her traveling theater group.

Cast
 San San Aye as Khin San
 Zaw Lwin as Sein Lin
 Aung Pyae as Hla Tun
 May Nwè as Daw Khyu, Khin San's mother
 Aung Soe as Owner of theater group

Restoration and international premiere
The film was restored by the Yangon Film School with the support of Goethe-Institut and screened at Wathann Film Fest in 2012. It had its international premiere at the 64th Berlin Film Festival in February 2014.

References

External links
 
 Berlin Film Festival press kit

1973 films
Burmese black-and-white films
1973 drama films
Films about actors